Maggie Michael is an Egyptian journalist. She won the 2019 Pulitzer Prize for International Reporting as part of an Associated Press (AP) team that covered the effects of the Yemen Civil War. She shared the award with Maad al-Zikry and Nariman El-Mofty. Michael began working for the AP in 2002 and worked to cover conflicts in the Middle East.

References 

Pulitzer Prize for International Reporting winners
Associated Press reporters
Year of birth missing (living people)
Living people
American women journalists
21st-century American women